Belfast East is a parliamentary constituency in the United Kingdom House of Commons. The current MP is Gavin Robinson of the DUP.

Boundaries

1885–1918: In the Borough of Belfast, that part of Dock ward not in Belfast North and that part of Cromac ward in County Down, the townlands of Ballycloghan, Ballyhackamore, Ballymaghan, Ballymisert and Strandtown in the parish of Holywood, and the townlands of Ballyrushboy, Knock and Multyhogy in the parish of Knockbreda.

1922–1974: The County Borough of Belfast wards of Dock, Pottinger, and Victoria.

1974–1983: The County Borough of Belfast wards of Pottinger and Victoria, and the Rural District of Castlereagh electoral divisions of Ballyhackamore, Ballymaconaghy, Ballymiscaw, Castlereagh, Dundonald, and Gilnakirk.

1983–1997: The District of Belfast wards of Ballyhackamore, Ballymacarrett, Belmont, Bloomfield, Island, Orangefield, Shandon, Stormont, Sydenham, and The Mount, and the District of Castlereagh wards of Cregagh, Downshire, Lisnasharragh, and Wynchurch.

1997–2010: The District of Belfast wards of Ballyhackamore, Ballymacarrett, Belmont, Bloomfield, Cherryvalley, Island, Knock, Orangefield, Stormont, Sydenham, and The Mount, and the District of Castlereagh wards of Cregagh, Downshire, Gilnakirk, Hillfoot, Lisnasharragh, Lower Braniel, Tullycarnet, Upper Braniel, and Wynchurch.

2010–present: The District of Belfast wards of Ballyhackamore, Ballymacarrett, Belmont, Bloomfield, Cherryvalley, Island, Knock, Orangefield, Stormont, Sydenham, and The Mount, and the District of Castlereagh wards of Ballyhanwood, Carrowreagh, Cregagh, Downshire, Dundonald, Enler, Gilnakirk, Graham's Bridge, Lisnasharragh, Lower Braniel, Tullycarnet, and Upper Braniel.

The seat was created in 1922 when, as part of the establishment of the devolved Stormont Parliament for Northern Ireland, the number of MPs in the Westminster Parliament was drastically cut. The seat is centred on the east section of Belfast and also contains part of the district of Castlereagh.

Prior to the 2010 general election the Northern Ireland Boundary Commission proposed expanding Belfast East further into Castlereagh, taking in areas currently contained in Strangford, however almost all of these areas were part of Belfast East until 1983. A small part of the constituency was proposed for transfer to Belfast South.

Following a public meeting and revised recommendations, the new boundaries of Belfast East were confirmed by the commission and passed through Parliament through the use of the Northern Ireland Parliamentary Constituencies Order.

History 
Belfast East is an overwhelmingly unionist constituency with nationalist parties routinely failing to get more than 10% of the vote combined. The main interest has been the contest between unionist parties and the fortunes of the Alliance Party of Northern Ireland.

Dominated by the giant Samson and Goliath cranes of the Harland and Wolff shipyard, the constituency is socially mixed. There are large expanses of small Victorian terraced housing near Belfast City Centre and around the shipyard in Ballymacarrett. These areas have seen significant refurbishment, and in some places demolition and redevelopment, in recent years sparking a sharp rise in house prices. This is contrasted by a large amount of solidly lower-middle class housing and some exclusive residential districts such as the much mocked Cherryvalley. This social polarisation is to a large degree reflected by the political polarisation, at least within the broader unionist family, in the seat. The small Catholic population is split between the largely working class Short Strand enclave and minorities in the more middle-class parts of the seat.

The seat was consistently held by the Ulster Unionist Party until the 1974 general election when the sitting MP, Stanley McMaster, defended it as a Pro-Assembly Unionist against a united anti-Sunningdale Agreement coalition which nominated William Craig of the Vanguard Progressive Unionist Party. Craig won the seat and held it for five years, moving to the UUP in February 1978.

In the 1979 general election the constituency witnessed a very close three-way fight between Peter Robinson of the Democratic Unionist Party, William Craig for the UUP and Oliver Napier for the Alliance Party of Northern Ireland. Less than 1000 votes separated the three candidates. Robinson beat Craig by the narrow margin of 64 votes. Also of note was that over 90% of votes went to parties that had not contested the seat at the previous election – in part due to realignments of the parties.

Robinson continued to hold the seat but the Alliance Party continued to poll well, and in 1987 John Alderdice polled 32.1% – the highest ever for Alliance in a Westminster election before 2010. However, their vote declined until 2010 and in 2005 they finished a distant third.

In the 2001 general election, Alliance proposed a pro-Good Friday Agreement pact with the Ulster Unionist Party in the hopes of getting UUP support in Belfast East. The UUP did not agree and so both parties stood. Robinson was re-elected with 42.5%, with the UUP, Alliance and Progressive Unionist Party carving up the pro-Agreement pro-union vote between them, but it is doubtful that an unopposed Alliance candidate could have consolidated all of that vote to beat Robinson.

In 2009 and 2010, Robinson became mired in a number of political scandals. In the 2010 general election, however, the Alliance Party candidate and sitting Lord Mayor of Belfast Naomi Long defeated Robinson, in a shock result, more than tripling the Alliance vote and giving the Alliance their first ever seat in Westminster. Predictably, this was also the seat in which the Alliance gained the highest vote share, at 37.2%, more than double their best efforts elsewhere.

Of the 18 seats in the region, East Belfast has the highest percentage of Methodists. The 2019 winning vote share was the fourth-largest of the region, but just short of an absolute majority.

Members of Parliament 
The Member of Parliament after the 2010 general election was Naomi Long, who defeated Peter Robinson, MP for Belfast East since the 1979 general election. Naomi Long subsequently lost her seat to Gavin Robinson in the 2015 general election.

Elections

Elections in the 2010s

Elections in the 2000s

Elections in the 1990s

1997 Changes are compared to the 1992 notional results shown below.

Elections in the 1980s

Note: The by-election was caused by the decision of all Unionist MPs to resign their seats and seek re-election on a platform of opposition to the Anglo-Irish Agreement.

Elections in the 1970s

Elections in the 1960s

Elections in the 1950s

Elections in the 1940s

Elections in the 1930s

Elections in the 1920s

Elections in the 1910s

Elections in the 1900s

Elections in the 1890s

Elections in the 1880s

See also 
 List of parliamentary constituencies in Northern Ireland

References

Further reading
F. W. S. Craig, British Parliamentary Election Results 1918 – 1949
F. W. S. Craig, British Parliamentary Election Results 1950 – 1970
The Constitutional Year Book For 1912, Conservative Central Office
The Constitutional Year Book For 1894, Conservative Central Office

External links 
Politics Resources (Election results from 1922 onwards)
Electoral Calculus (Election results from 1955 onwards)
2017 Election House of Commons Library 2017 Election report
A Vision Of Britain Through Time (Constituency elector numbers)
BBC News, Election 2005
BBC News, Vote 2001
Guardian Unlimited Politics

Politicsresources.net - Official Web Site ✔  (Election results from 1951 to the present)

Westminster Parliamentary constituencies in Belfast
Westminster Parliamentary constituencies in Northern Ireland
Constituencies of the Parliament of the United Kingdom established in 1885
Constituencies of the Parliament of the United Kingdom disestablished in 1918
Constituencies of the Parliament of the United Kingdom established in 1922